Belgium took 31 competitors to the 1978 European Athletics Championships which took place between 29 August and 3 September 1978 in Prague. Belgium took one medal during the Championship.

Medalists

References 

Nations at the 1978 European Athletics Championships
1978
1978 in Belgian sport